Baron Rüdiger von Wechmar (15 November 1923 – 17 October 2007) was a German diplomat. He was West German ambassador to the UN in the 1970s. During the thirty-fifth ordinary and the eighth emergency special sessions, from 1980 to 1981, he was President of the United Nations General Assembly.

Early life

Wechmar was born in Berlin, Germany, the son of Irnfried Freiherr von Wechmar. In 1941, while a 17-year-old student at a National Political Institute of Education ("Napola"), he joined the German Army as a volunteer, and fought in the Afrika Korps under Erwin Rommel for two years, until he was taken prisoner of war by the Americans. While imprisoned in the United States, he studied journalism.

After the war ended, Wechmar worked as a journalist, and in 1958 he entered the diplomatic service. He was posted to the German embassy in Washington and to the Consulate General in New York.

In 1963, he became a correspondent for German television in Eastern Europe, but returned to the diplomatic service in 1968. The following year he was appointed as under-secretary of state and government spokesman. In 1974 he became ambassador to the United Nations. He represented West Germany as president of the UN Security Council in 1977 and 1978 and was later the West German Ambassador in Italy (1981-1983) and in the United Kingdom (1983-1988). Baron von Wechmar was a member of the multinational Bilderberg Group.

Personal life
Wechmar was married and with his wife had three children.

Death

He died of a stroke on October 17, 2007 in Munich, Germany.

References

External links
 Obituary in The Times, 24 October 2007

1923 births
2007 deaths
Barons of Germany
German prisoners of war in World War II held by the United States
German male journalists
Ambassadors of West Germany to the United Kingdom
Ambassadors of West Germany to Italy
Presidents of the United Nations General Assembly
Permanent Representatives of West Germany to the United Nations
Writers from Berlin
German male writers
Commanders Crosses of the Order of Merit of the Federal Republic of Germany
20th-century German journalists